In linguistics, a desiderative (abbreviated  or ) form is one that has the meaning of "wanting to X".  Desiderative forms are often verbs, derived from a more basic verb through a process of morphological derivation. Desiderative mood is a kind of volitive mood.

Sanskrit
In Sanskrit, the desiderative is formed through the suffixing of /sa/ and the prefixing of a reduplicative syllable, consisting of the first consonant of the root (sometimes modified) and a vowel, usually /i/ but /u/ if the root has an /u/ in it.  Changes to the root vowel sometimes happen, as well. The acute accent, which indicates high pitch in Vedic, is usually placed at the first vowel.

For example:

Meadow Mari
In Meadow Mari, the desiderative mood is marked by the suffix -не -ne.

Positive present

Negative present

Japanese
In Japanese, the desiderative takes two main forms: -tai (-たい) and -tagaru (-たがる). Both forms conjugate for tense and positivity, but in different ways: with the -tai ending, the verb becomes an -i adjective, or a conjugable adjective, while the ending -tagaru (-tai + -garu suffix) creates a godan/yodan verb. Though there are other, compound forms to demonstrate wanting, these two alone are demonstrated because they are inflections of the main verb. These two forms are plain/informal in nature, and can be elevated to the normal-polite and other levels through normal methods.

-tai is an absolute statement of desire, whereas -tagaru indicates the appearance of desire. Generally, one does not say things such as 太郎さんが食べたい Tarō wants to eat because one cannot read Tarō's thoughts; instead, one says 太郎さんが食べたがる it appears that Tarō wants to eat.

Godan Verbs

Ichidan Verbs

Proto-Indo-European
Proto-Indo-European likely had a desiderative. In some daughter languages like Indo-Iranian, Balto-Slavic and possibly Celtic, it acquired the meaning of a future tense.

References

Grammatical moods